Gaspar García Laviana  (November 8, 1941 — December 11, 1978) was a Spanish Roman Catholic priest who took up arms to fight as a  soldier in Nicaragua with the Sandinista National Liberation Front (FSLN) in 1977.

Early life
García Laviana was born in 1941 in Les Roces, San Martin del Rey Aurelio, Principality of Asturias (Spain) moving during his childhood to Tuilla, Langreo. He was ordained a priest of the Missionaries of the Sacred Heart (MSC) in 1966. After taking charge of a church in Logroño for three years, working at the same time as a carpenter.

Missionary in Nicaragua
In 1969 arrived to Nicaragua as a missionary priest. Through his missionary work with Pedro Regalado in the parishes of San Juan del Sur and Tola in the department of Rivas, García Laviana worked closely with the Nicaraguan peasants and was intimately aware of the many hardships they faced. He joined other progressive Christians in concientización (or awareness raising) in poor rural communities around the country.

An Activist against Social Injustice
Gaspar happened to arrive in a country where a revolution was in the making. His work as a missionary inevitably led him to take sides with the poor and join the revolutionary process. His noisy complaints about the neglect of the poor, including sit-ins in government offices, caught the attention of Anastasio Somoza's administration. García Laviana was also an outspoken critic of the brothels located in his parish, many operating with underage girls.

Exile in Costa Rica and Involvement in the Revolution
When he exposed this scandal on the radio, Somoza's National Guard tried on two occasions to assassinate him. He fled to Costa Rica where he met exiled members of the Sandinista National Liberation Front (FSLN). He agreed with them that the overthrow of Somoza was a moral—even religious—necessity. After agonizing soul-searching, and deep reading in church doctrine, he decided that taking up arms to fight evil did not violate his Christian principles. His decision was broadcast in two secretly distributed public letters that made clear that, with a heavy heart, he felt armed struggle was his Christian duty as a priest in solidarity with the oppressed. Trained in explosives in Cuba, he returned to Central America and joined the "'Benjamin Zeledon' Southern Front" in the Sandinista guerrilla war against Somoza. His unit was betrayed by a traitor and was ambushed on a farm along the Costa Rican border called "El Infierno." Gaspar rose up to fire when he should have stayed down; he was killed instantly. He never lived to see the triumph of the insurrection the following July.

Legacy
A closet poet, García Laviana expressed his outrage at the poverty and neglect of Nicaraguan peasants, society, as well as his own mixture of emotions as he took up arms,  in many secretly circulated poems that, after the triumph of the insurrection were published as a collection in 1979 called Songs of Love and War; this was the first book published by the Sandinista government's Ministry of Culture, headed by another poet and priest, Ernesto Cardenal.  Biographies include GASPAR VIVE by Fr. Manuel Rodriguez Garcia (privately printed, 1981) and !GASPAR! A SPANISH POET/PRIEST IN THE NICARAGUAN REVOLUTION by David Gullette (Bilingual Press, 1994) which contains a bilingual collection of his most important poetry.

Laviana was a priest who was greatly influenced by the spirit of Liberation Theology which focused on a "preferential option for the poor" declared at the Latin American Bishop's conferences at Medellín and Cuernavaca.

Daniel Ortega, president of Nicaragua, acknowledged the importance of García Laviana's participation in the revolutionary struggle. García Laviana's involvement in the Nicaraguan Revolution encouraged Catholics to support the FSLN by providing the revolutionary movement with a sense of moral legitimacy.  Many of García Laviana's concerns became priorities for the Sandinistas when they assumed power. The revolutionary government took up health care as a major priority, implemented agrarian reform initiatives that redistributed land back to many peasants individually and in cooperatives, made education through the fourth grade free and universal, and denounced prostitution.

See also
The Catholic Church and the Nicaraguan Revolution

References

1941 births
1978 deaths
Liberation theologians
Members of the Sandinista National Liberation Front
People from San Martín del Rey Aurelio
20th-century Spanish Roman Catholic theologians
Spanish Roman Catholic priests
Catholicism and far-left politics